The 2016 FIA Formula 3 European Championship was a multi-event motor racing championship for single-seat open wheel formula racing cars that is held across Europe. The championship features drivers competing in two-litre Formula Three racing cars which conform to the technical regulations, or formula, for the championship. It is the fifth edition of the FIA Formula 3 European Championship.

Felix Rosenqvist was the defending drivers' champion, but was unable to defend his title, because of a new rule which determined that drivers could spend no more than three years in the category. His team, Prema Powerteam, were the defending winners of the teams' championship.

2016 was the final season that the Dallara F312 chassis package, which débuted in the 2012 season, was used in competition, as a brand new chassis package was introduced for 2017.

Teams and drivers
The following teams and drivers competed during the 2016 season:

Driver changes
Joining FIA European Formula 3
2015 Italian F4 champion Ralf Aron entered the series with Prema Powerteam.
Ben Barnicoat, who came fourth in the 2015 Eurocup Formula Renault 2.0 season, joined the series with HitechGP, after an initial deal with Prema Powerteam fell through.
David Beckmann, who raced in ADAC Formula 4, continued his collaboration with Mücke Motorsport into the championship, but missed the first two rounds on account of his age.
Nick Cassidy, who raced for Prema Powerteam in two rounds of the 2015 season, raced full-time with the team.
ADAC Formula 4 runner-up Joel Eriksson, brother of GP3 driver Jimmy Eriksson, joined the series with Motopark.
Anthoine Hubert, who finished fifth in the 2015 Eurocup Formula Renault 2.0 season, joined the series with Van Amersfoort Racing.
2015 SMP F4 champion and Red Bull Junior driver Niko Kari joined the series with Motopark.
Nikita Mazepin joined the series with HitechGP.
Harrison Newey, son of F1 engineer Adrian Newey and runner-up in BRDC Formula 4, made his debut in the series with Van Amersfoort Racing.
Pedro Piquet, son of three time Formula One champion Nelson Piquet and two-time Brazilian Formula Three champion, stepped up to the series with Van Amersfoort Racing.
2015 Italian F4 runner-up Guanyu Zhou joined the championship with Motopark.

Changing Teams
Maximilian Günther, who raced for Mücke Motorsport for most of 2015 before switching to Prema Powerteam during the last round, stayed with Prema in 2016.
Raoul Hyman switched from Team West-Tec F3 to Carlin.
Callum Ilott, who raced for Carlin in 2015, switched to Van Amersfoort Racing.
Zhi Cong Li switched from Fortec Motorsports to Carlin.
Alessio Lorandi, who raced for Van Amersfoort in 2015, switched to Carlin.
Arjun Maini, switched from Van Amersfoort Racing to T-Sport.
George Russell, who raced for Carlin in 2015, switched to HitechGP.

Leaving Formula 3
Jake Dennis, Tatiana Calderón and Santino Ferrucci, who finished third, 27th and 11th in the 2015 season, stepped up to GP3 with Arden International and DAMS respectively.
Rookie champion Charles Leclerc and Alexander Albon, who finished fourth and seventh in 2015 respectively, left the series to compete in GP3 with ART Grand Prix.
2015 runner-up Antonio Giovinazzi stepped up to GP2 with Prema Powerteam.
Pietro Fittipaldi, who finished 17th in 2015, stepped up to Formula V8 3.5 with Fortec.
2015 champion Felix Rosenqvist was ruled out of returning to the series due to a new rule, which said that drivers could spend no more than three years in the category. He joined the Indy Lights with Belardi Auto Racing.

Team changes
After making two appearances in the 2015 season, HitechGP returned full-time to the series, in collaboration with ART Grand Prix.
Double R Racing, Signature Team, EuroInternational, Team West-Tec and Artline Engineering withdrew.

Calendar

A provisional ten-round calendar was announced on 2 December 2015.

Results

Championship standings
Scoring system

Drivers' championship

Rookies' Championship

Teams' championship
Prior to each round of the championship, two drivers from each team – if applicable – were nominated to score teams' championship points.

Footnotes

References

External links

FIA Formula 3 European Championship
FIA Formula 3 European Championship
FIA Formula 3 European Championship
Formula 3